Donal Richard Leace  (May 6, 1939 – November 21, 2020) was an American musician and educator.

Early life and education
Leace was born in Huntington, West Virginia, and raised in Philadelphia, later moving to New York City and Washington D.C. He received a degree from Howard University and graduate degrees from Georgetown University and George Washington University. He was also honored as both a Fulbright Scholar and US Presidential Scholar.

Career
During the 1960s, he worked and lived at The Cellar Door in Georgetown.  For a while a sign at the club read “The Home of Donal Leace”. He performed with John Denver, Nina Simone, Odetta, Judy Collins, Muddy Waters, Ramsey Lewis, The Staple Singers, The Chad Mitchell Trio, Manhattan Transfer, Take 6, Sonny Terry, Brownie McGhee, Big Mama Thornton and Emmylou Harris. He toured nationally with Nancy Wilson and worldwide with Roberta Flack.

He also appeared and recorded with comedians Bill Cosby, Richard Pryor, Mort Sahl and Dick Gregory. Leace had notable Television appearances on The Today Show, Sunday Morning, and the David Frost show. Leace is mentioned in the discography of Keith Jarrett. Leace was Chair of the Drama Department at the Duke Ellington School of the Arts, Washington, DC, where some of his notable students included Dave Chappelle and Denyce Graves. Leace often appeared on Dick Cerri's radio show, Music Americana and participated in World Folk Music Association (WFMA) events including their annual concerts.

Leace’s recordings of “Oh! Alabama” and “The Death of Medgar Evers” on some of his many recordings captured the pathos of the 60’s Civil Rights era.  His 1962 recording "At The Shadows" with Carol Hedin was groundbreaking featuring Leace, a black male folk singer-guitarist and Hedin, a white female singer and autoharpist, a racial crossover. It was recorded at "The Shadows" restaurant in Washington, D.C., on September 16, 1962.

Death
Leace died from COVID-19 in Washington D.C., on November 21, 2020, at the age of 81.

Industry awards
Washington Area Music Association Hall of Fame – 2000 

Washingtonian Magazine's "Washington Music Hall of Fame"  – 2003

Discography
Leace made several recordings.

Specific examples follow.

At The Shadows with Carol Hedin (1962) - Franc
Donal Leace At The Cellar Door (1965) - Gateway Recordings
Donal Leace (1972) – Atlantic
Leace On Life (1992) – JBL
Freedom Is A Constant Struggle: Songs of the Mississippi Civil Rights Movement (1994) - Folk Era Productions
Leace Renewed (2001) – JBL

References

Notes

Sources 
 Donal "Don" Leace Obituary, The Washington Post (29 Nov. 2020)
 Christgau, Robert. “Growing by Degrees: Kanye West.” in Is It Still Good to Ya?: Fifty Years of Rock Criticism, 1967-2017 (Duke University Press, Durham; London, 2018), pp. 301–303. Accessed 10 Jan. 2021.
 Epstein, Daniel Mark. The Ballad of Bob Dylan: A Portrait (2011), p. 4.
 Kalodner, John David. "Roberta Flack at the Academy: A Great Setting, a Great Singer," Philadelphia Bulletin (10 Oct. 1973)
 Weinberg, Jack, et al. Los Angeles Free Press, vol. 6, no. 281, 1969. JSTOR; accessed 10 Jan. 2021.
 Weinberg, Jack, et al. Los Angeles Free Press, vol. 6, no. 282, 1969. JSTOR; accessed 10 Jan. 2021.

External links
 Donal Leace – Rate Your Music 
 The education of Dave Chappelle: How a D.C. arts school prepared him for stardom 

1939 births
2020 deaths
American folk singers
American male singers
Deaths from the COVID-19 pandemic in Washington, D.C.
Singers from West Virginia
Musicians from Huntington, West Virginia